Grim Reaper (Eric Williams) is a supervillain appearing in American comic books published by Marvel Comics. He is also the brother of Wonder Man.

Publication history

The Grim Reaper first appeared in The Avengers #52 May (1968), by Roy Thomas and John Buscema. He has been killed many times, depicted in Web of Spider-Man #46, Dark Reign: Lethal Legion #2, Chaos War: Dead Avengers #3, Uncanny Avengers #5 and #21, and Vision Vol. 3, #1.

Fictional character biography
Eric Williams, the brother of Simon Williams, was born in Paterson, New Jersey. Eric was the black sheep of his family. His mother Martha would tell him that he was "born bad", while heaping affection on Simon. Eric's father was charged with disciplining him, but was abusive and uncaring. His father even preferred to watch TV lazily, while Eric was torturing the family cat. At the same time, their mother was loving and attentive to Simon, making Eric bitter and jealous.

One day Eric was playing with chemicals in the garage, and caused a fire which burned down their house. Simon felt guilty for not stopping Eric, and resolved to be responsible for Eric from there on. As they grew older, Simon grew studious while Eric was an athlete. Eric also became more rebellious, and tried to get Simon to join in his petty thefts. Eric eventually became a gambler, joined the Maggia and moved to Las Vegas, while Simon took over the family business, Williams Innovations.

When Williams Innovations began to fail, partly due to competition with Stark Industries, the desperate Simon turned to Eric's mob ties for help. Simon embezzled money from the company to invest with Eric, but Simon was caught and jailed. Simon was freed from jail by Baron Heinrich Zemo, induced by an offer of revenge on Iron Man and the Avengers to which Eric's brother was transformed into Wonder Man. Learning of his brother's death, Eric was inflamed with guilt and anger. Through his Maggia contacts, he contacted the Tinkerer to provide him with his scythe weapon, which was further enhanced by Ultron with coma-inducing abilities. Taking the "Grim Reaper" name, he became a professional criminal and defeated Hawkeye, Goliath and the Wasp, placing the three Avengers in comas, but was beaten by the Black Panther's surprise appearance.

In his next appearance, the Grim Reaper confronted the Avengers with his original Lethal Legion composed of the Living Laser, Power Man, the Man-Ape and the Swordsman. He first sent the Man-Ape against them, who captured Black Panther. He allowed Black Panther to escape so that the Avengers could be contacted so they would be lured to the Lethal Legion members' location, before capturing Black Panther again. He captured nearly all of them, placing them in an hourglass filled with a deadly gas, and sent Power Man after the Vision who defeated Power Man by disguising himself as Power Man and Power Man as himself. The Lethal Legion was defeated when Grim Reaper found himself unable to strike down Vision, having discovered that the syntheizoid possessed his brother's brainwave patterns. He released 'Vision' by breaking the hourglass, meaning the Avengers were freed and defeated the Lethal Legion.

The Grim Reaper later allied with the Space Phantom and HYDRA. He planned to transfer the Vision's mind to Wonder Man's body, thus "resurrecting" his brother. He battled the Avengers again and was defeated.

Behind the scenes, the Grim Reaper later had Wonder Man resurrected as a zombie by the Black Talon to attack the Avengers. Wonder Man was restored to true life as a result. Grim Reaper then captured the Avengers, and staged a trial to determine whether the Vision or Wonder Man was his true brother. He was defeated by Wonder Man.

Later, the Grim Reaper attempted to kill both the Vision and Wonder Man, but was defeated by Vision.

Later still, the Grim Reaper with Ultron, Nekra and other allies, captured the Avengers. Grim Reaper attempted a recreation of "Simon Williams" as a zombie. He was pursued by the Vision and Wonder Man in a cave, and died in a fall from the cave ledge. Grim Reaper was then resurrected by Nekra as a zombie, but he believed himself to be alive. The zombie battled Wonder Man and Magneto, but when he realized he was actually dead, he "died" again as a result.

Much later, the Grim Reaper was resurrected by the time travelling Immortus as a member of his Legion of the Unliving. Grim Reaper battled Wonder Man, and "died" again of a broken neck. He was then resurrected by Nekra as a zombie again, this time under the condition that he absorb a human life-force every 24 hours. He killed Nekra as his first victim, and then battled Wonder Man before escaping. He battled Wonder Man and the Mandrill, and escaped again. The scythe was fused to his arm by Ultron, and he formed an alliance with Ultron.

The Grim Reaper was later restored to life by the Scarlet Witch's magic. When Ultron attempted to create a new "family" for himself, Grim Reaper was abducted as one of the six individuals that came closest to being Ultron's "family" - the others being Hank Pym, Wasp, Vision, Scarlet Witch, and Wonder Man. Ultron regarded Grim Reaper as the first human connection made apart from Pym, as well as the connections to Wonder Man and Vision. While Vision distracted Ultron, Eric was able to escape his bonds and free the other prisoners, although he subsequently fled, informing Vision that he only released the others to save himself rather than any more noble goal.

The Grim Reaper reappeared during the Secret War aftermath that had been organized by Nick Fury against Latveria. He was among the supervillains who had been supplied with enhanced technology by Latverian dictator Lucia von Bardas and sent to attack the heroes who had been involved in Fury's Secret War.

The Grim Reaper was apparently one of the many villains that escaped from the Raft prison. Being at large for several months, the Grim Reaper was eventually tracked down by Captain America and Cable during the "Civil War" storyline. Captain America and Cable brought Grim Reaper down with the aid of their other friends. He was found bound to a pole along with the Vulture. He was once again put into custody by S.H.I.E.L.D.

Grim Reaper is next seen teaming with Man-Ape and Saboteur.

During the Dark Reign storyline, the Grim Reaper later formed a new lineup of Lethal Legion as part of a plan against Norman Osborn. The team is ultimately defeated by the Dark Avengers and H.A.M.M.E.R. agents and imprisoned in The Raft. While there, Grim Reaper is stabbed in the heart by an inmate loyal to Osborn, and has to undergo an operation. It is also revealed that Simon is a member of the Lethal Legion, also imprisoned in the Raft. Grim Reaper is then revealed to have died as a result of the stabbing.

During the Chaos War storyline, the Grim Reaper returns from the dead following what happened to the death realms and becomes a servant of Amatsu-Mikaboshi. He and Nekra fight the "Dead Avengers" (consisting of Captain Marvel, Deathcry, Doctor Druid, Swordsman, Vision and Yellowjacket). He manages to kill most of them except for Swordsman and Yellowjacket. Grim Reaper and Nekra are killed when Vision self-destructs.

As part of the 2012-2013 "Marvel NOW!" relaunch, the Grim Reaper turns up alive and attacks the Avengers Unity Squad's debut press conference claiming that he is now unable to die. He is seemingly killed by Rogue punching him harder than expected after absorbing Wonder Man's powers. He is restored to life by a Celestial Death Seed, and is recruited by the Apocalypse Twins as part of their new Horsemen of Death. He attacks Simon, defeating and capturing his brother. Grim Reaper destroys Earth and helps teleport all mutants to Planet X. After the Apocalypse Twins are defeated, Grim Reaper escapes with Daken.

He later returns to launch a surprise attack against the Vision's new synthezoid family. The Vision is not present at the time, and Grim Reaper is able to severely injure Viv, the Vision's daughter. Vision's wife Virginia is able to fight back, but accidentally kills Grim Reaper in the process, a fact she hides from her husband. His body is buried in the backyard of the Vision's suburban home, until it is discovered by the neighbor's dog, who is accidentally electrocuted to death upon biting Grim Reaper's scythe. The discovery alerts Vision to the body, and sends him into a short lived rage in which he destroys the family home. Ultimately, Vision decides to keep the death of Grim Reaper secret, to protect his family from the legal consequences and possible backlash from his fellow Avengers. The body is shown to be removed from the backyard.

During the "Damnation" storyline, Grim Reaper is revived when Doctor Strange uses his magic to restore Las Vegas.

After The War of the Realms, Grim Reaper is approached by Mephisto, who offers him the chance to kill the Vision in return for becoming his new Valkyrie (following the deaths of all others to bear the name during the war against Malekith). When Jane Foster taking on the position complicates matters, Grim Reaper is sent to take a hero's soul into the afterlife in order to cement his claim to the name. He targets Doctor Strange, trapping his soul in a magic mirror. Jane takes him on as Valkyrie, and defeats him by taking him to Valhalla.

Powers, abilities, and equipment

Equipment
Previously, the Grim Reaper is a purely technological-based villain with no innate superhuman abilities. The techno-scythe he wore on his right arm as a trademark weapon was designed by the Tinkerer. This scythe has the ability to spin its own blade at rapid speeds, thus making it usable as a hyper-fast propeller buzzsaw, missile shield, and an improvised helicopter. It can fire concussive plasma blasts or anaesthetic gas pellets, as well as dispense electric stun shocks on touch. His scythe was also equipped with a cerebral-frequency generator, able to induce deep comas and revive victims from their sleep.

Current powers
The Grim Reaper later gained some mystical powers. This allows him to reanimate the dead, teleport himself or others, summon demons, create illusions, and perceive visual sensations. His physical strength, stamina, and durability were slightly heightened beyond the human body's natural limitations. In addition, his right hand had been amputated and replaced with an apparently magical scythe. This new scythe is also capable of limited energy manipulation.

Former abilities
At one point, the Grim Reaper came back to life as a zombie via resurrection. He suffered hair loss, including sallow skin in various stages of decomposition. In this form, he absorbs human life-forces in order to sustain his own and remain "alive" once every 24 hours, either through his left hand or scythe.

Other versions
In the 1999 miniseries Earth X, an alternate version of Eric Williams appears in  the Realm of the Dead.
In the 2003-2004 intercompany crossover miniseries JLA/Avengers, the Grim Reaper is shown in a backstory of the Justice League and Avengers' team-ups. In one story, he and the Key stole the Serpent Crown and kidnapped Zatanna and Mantis to use them as a key to celestial power. Later he is shown near the end of the heroes' battle against Krona's army of enthralled villains, where he is defeated by Superman.
In the 1995 miniseries The Last Avengers Story, William Maximoff, the son of the Vision and Scarlet Witch, grew up to be known as the Grim Reaper. He allied with Kang and Ultron against the Avengers. He used magic and had a scythe.

In other media

Television
 The Grim Reaper appears in The Avengers: United They Stand episode "The Sorceress' Apprentice", voiced by Allan Royal. This version wears full body armor and a helmet painted to resemble a skull.
 The Grim Reaper appears in The Avengers: Earth's Mightiest Heroes, voiced by Lance Henriksen. This version is a member of HYDRA and one of Baron Strucker's lieutenants.
 A variation of the Grim Reaper appears in the Iron Man: Armored Adventures episode "Mandarin's Quest". This version is a Makluan guardian created by the original Mandarin to guard one of his Makluan Rings and test potential successors by trapping them in nightmarish hallucinations.
 The Grim Reaper appears in Avengers Assemble, voiced by Roger Craig Smith.

Film
The Grim Reaper makes an uncredited appearance in Avengers Confidential: Black Widow & Punisher.

Video games
 Grim Reaper appears as a boss in Captain America and the Avengers.
 Grim Reaper appears as a mini-boss in Marvel: Ultimate Alliance 2, voiced by Rick D. Wasserman.
 Grim Reaper appears as a boss in Marvel: Avengers Alliance.
 Grim Reaper appears as a boss in Marvel Heroes, voiced by Robin Atkin Downes.
 Grim Reaper appears as a playable character in Lego Marvel's Avengers.

References

External links
 Grim Reaper at Marvel.com
 Grim Reaper at Comic Vine
 Grim Reaper at Writeups.org

Characters created by John Buscema
Characters created by Roy Thomas
Comics characters introduced in 1968
Fictional amputees
Fictional bodyguards
Fictional characters from New Jersey
Fictional characters with absorption or parasitic abilities
Fictional characters with energy-manipulation abilities
Fictional characters with precognition
Fictional characters with superhuman durability or invulnerability
Fictional illusionists
Hydra (comics) agents
Marvel Comics characters who can teleport
Marvel Comics characters who use magic
Marvel Comics characters with superhuman strength
Marvel Comics cyborgs
Marvel Comics male supervillains
Marvel Comics mutates
Marvel Comics undead characters